The Full Gospel Baptist Church Fellowship (FGBCF) or Full Gospel Baptist Church Fellowship International (FGBCFI) is a predominantly African-American Charismatic Baptist denomination established by Bishop Paul Sylvester Morton, a former National Baptist pastor and Gospel singer. Established out of response to the teachings of many predominantly traditionalist Baptist denominations and churches upholding cessationism, the Full Gospel Baptist Church Fellowship advocates for the operation of Pentecostal and Charismatic Christian spiritual gifts, while also holding to some traditional Baptist doctrine and traditions.

Reminiscing early Baptist Christianity's acceptance of a modified episcopacy within congregationalist tenets per the 1689 Baptist Confession of Faith (as Baptists originated in 1609 from the Church of England, which schismed with the Roman Church—both upholding the historic episcopacy), Full Gospel Baptists developed a presbyteral-episcopal polity not found in the historic black Baptist denominations while maintaining congregationalist distinctives.

The FGBCF was reported to have over 10,000 active members in 1993 and 20,000 in 1995; in 1997 it claimed 1 million members and 5,000 churches throughout the United States. In 2020, they reported more than 800 affiliated churches and claimed to have almost 2 million members. Headquartered in Atlanta, Georgia, the Full Gospel Baptist Church Fellowship is led by Bishop Joseph W. Walker III, of Nashville, Tennessee as the Presiding Bishop, who was appointed to succeed Bishop Morton upon his retirement.

History
The Full Gospel Baptist Church Fellowship was established by Bishop Paul S. Morton, Sr. in 1994 within New Orleans, Louisiana, though it began as a movement within the National Baptist Convention, USA, Inc. in 1992. From 25,000 to 30,000 attended the first conference of the Full Gospel Baptist Church Fellowship in 1994. Exploring the gifts of the Holy Spirit against traditionally cessationist Baptist pastors and laymen within the National Baptist Convention, National Baptist Convention of America, and the Progressive National Baptist Convention, alongside establishing an episcopal Baptist governance, Morton and those affiliated with the fellowship "were lovingly advised to resign their posts with the NBCUSA before they were kicked out." In 1995, Bishop Morton left the National Baptist Convention, USA, Inc. following the controversies among traditional black Baptists.

Attracting some of the largest churches by membership from the oldest black Baptist denomination—the NBC USA—New Birth Missionary Baptist Church became a notable affiliate before leaving the fellowship during Bishop Eddie Long's pastoral tenure after multiple controversies surrounding their leadership at New Birth. Eddie Long was consecrated a bishop by Paul Morton in the 1990s; Bishop Morton was consecrated into the episcopacy by George Augustus Stallings of the Imani Temple African-American Catholic Congregation, an independent Catholic church.

In 2013, Bishop Morton resigned as Presiding Bishop of the Full Gospel Baptist Church Fellowship and appointed Bishop Joseph W. Walker III in Nashville, Tennessee as successor. Walker, born in Shreveport, Louisiana and serving as one of the founding fathers of the Full Gospel Baptist Church Fellowship, assumed presiding office and Bishop Neil Ellis schismed through establishing the Global United Fellowship after losing the election to succeed Morton.

Doctrine
Like most Baptist denominations, Full Gospel Baptists uphold believer's baptism by full immersion; soul competency; sola fide; and congregational autonomy. However, in addition to traditional Baptist doctrine, the fellowship also believes in Pentecostal-Charismatic doctrines such as speaking in tongues, laying on of hands, divine healing, and prophecy. Likewise, the Full Gospel Baptist Church Fellowship places special emphasis on practicing holiness, or Christian sanctification; overall, their theological distinctives in the Baptist tradition tend to merge with the separate Protestant tradition of Wesleyan-Arminian theology.

Embracing a mixture of congregationalist, presbyterian, and episcopal polity, Full Gospel Baptists as a collective are governed by the Full Gospel Baptist Council of Bishops. The Presiding Bishop is the head clerical and executive leader of the fellowship, exercising authority along with other episcopates to provide administration. Within the Full Gospel Baptist Church Fellowship, its bishops claim apostolic succession through Bishop Morton's consecrator, the excommunicated Roman Catholic George Augustus Stallings whose episcopal genealogy leads to Carlos Duarte Costa and the Brazilian Catholic Apostolic Church. Relieved of religious duties within the Roman Catholic Church, the concept of "valid but illicit" ordinations guaranteed Stallings episcopacy remaining valid to whoever recognized it as such.

Apostolic succession though, according to Roman and Anglican churches however, effects the power and authority to administer the sacraments except for baptism and matrimony; and it pertains to continuity of the universal teaching, preaching, governing, ordination, and grace. As the Full Gospel Baptist Church Fellowship doesn't hold as much historic continuity in sacramental catholicity as Anglicans, Roman Catholics, and the Eastern Orthodox churches, their claim to holy orders may not be recognized as from a church, rather an ecclesial community. Additionally, Full Gospel Baptists also ordain and consecrate a significant number of female pastors and bishops as well, although the majority of their clergy is still male.

References

External links

 Official website

 

Historically African-American Christian denominations
Christian organizations established in 1994
Baptist denominations
Baptist denominations established in the 20th century
Charismatic denominations